The Office of Transport and Traffic Policy and Planning or OTP is a department of the Thai government, under the Ministry of Transport. It is responsible for creating policy for transport and traffic. It was created in 2002 as part of a policy reform. It is responsible for planning mass transit in Thailand via master plans such as the Mass Rapid Transit Master Plan in Bangkok Metropolitan Region or M-Map, and feasibility studies such as those for the Khon Kaen Light Rail. It does not operate transit networks, which may be managed by the MRTA, State Railway of Thailand or private enterprises. The current Director General is Sarawut Songsivilai.

External links 
About OTP
OTP official website

References 

Government departments of Thailand
Transport organizations based in Thailand
Ministry of Transport (Thailand)